Shri Sanathana Dharma Aalayam is a temple under construction at West Jakarta, Indonesia. As planned, it would be the first Dravidian architecture Hindu Temple in Jakarta. The temple will be  built on an area of 4,000 square meters in Kalideres, West Jakarta, will also become a tourist destination. Not only places of worship, there will be parks and multipurpose rooms for the public, especially for local residents.

References

Lists of Hindu temples
Lists of religious buildings and structures in Indonesia
Hindu temples in Indonesia
Temples in Indonesia
Buildings and structures in Jakarta
Cultural Properties of Indonesia in Jakarta
Lists of Hindu temples in South East Asia
West Jakarta